Tornike Sanikidze (born 1989) is a Georgian chess grandmaster. He was awarded the titles of International Master in 2005 and Grandmaster in 2008. He won the Georgian championship in 2009.

He has represented Georgia at the Chess Olympiad, including:
 2012, where he scored 4/7 on board three.
 2016, scoring 3½/6 on first reserve.

References

External links

Tornike Sanikidze chess games at 365Chess.com

1989 births
Living people
Chess players from Georgia (country)
Chess grandmasters
Chess Olympiad competitors